Dick Sudirman (29 April 1922 – 10 June 1986) was a former Indonesian badminton player.

He was also the founder of Badminton Association of Indonesia (PBSI) as well as its chairman for 22 years (1952–1963 and 1967–1981). He was also the vice president of IBF in 1975.

His surname "Sudirman" is used for the Sudirman Cup, the world mixed team badminton championship.

External links
Profile at Worldbadminton.net

1922 births
1986 deaths
Indonesian male badminton players
20th-century Indonesian people